The 2017–18 Memphis Tigers women's basketball team will represent the University of Memphis during the 2017–18 NCAA Division I women's basketball season. The season marks the fifth for the Tigers as members of the American Athletic Conference. The Tigers, led by tenth year head coach Melissa McFerrin, plays their home games at the Elma Roane Fieldhouse. They finished the season 10–20, 5–11 in AAC play to finish in a tie for eighth place. They lost in the first round of the American Athletic women's tournament to Tulane.

Media
All Tigers home games will have a radio broadcast live on WUMR. Video streaming for all home games will be available on the Memphis Tiger Network, ESPN3, or AAC Digital. Road games will typically be streamed on the opponents website, though conference road games could also appear on ESPN3 or AAC Digital.

Roster

Schedule and results

|-
!colspan=12 style="background:#0C1C8C; color:#8E9295;"| Exhibition

|-
!colspan=12 style="background:#0C1C8C; color:#8E9295;"| Non-conference regular season

|-
!colspan=12 style="background:#0C1C8C; color:#8E9295;"| AAC regular season

|-
!colspan=12 style="background:#0C1C8C; color:#8E9295;"| AAC Women's Tournament

See also
 2017–18 Memphis Tigers men's basketball team

References

Memphis
Memphis Tigers women's basketball seasons